Grut is a Nordic surname that may refer to:

Edmund Hansen Grut (1831–1907), Danish ophthalmologist
Thomas Alfred Grut (1852–1933), Guernsey photographer and author
Torben Grut (1871–1945), Swedish architect
William Grut (1914–2012), Swedish modern pentathlete, son of Torben